Canal+ Premium (formerly Canal+) is Poland's variation of the French television network Canal+. It is similar in many ways, including continuity and presentation.

Canal+ Poland currently consists of 12 high-definition channels: Canal+ Premium, Canal+1, Canal+ Sport, Canal+ Sport2, Canal+ Sport3, Canal+ Sport4, Canal+ Film, Canal+ Seriale, Canal+ Family, Canal+ Dokument, Canal+ Now, and Canal+ 4K Ultra HD.

Logo

TV Sports rights
Polish Ekstraklasa
English Premier League (together with Viaplay)
Spanish LaLiga (together with Eleven Sports)
French Ligue 1 (together with Eleven Sports)
Rugby Six Nations Championship
American NBA
Speedway Grand Prix
Speedway Enea Ekstraliga
Speedway World Cup
MMA Bellator Fighting Championship
U.S. Open (golf)

Film rights
20th Century Studios
DreamWorks
MGM
Monolith Films
Paramount Pictures
StudioCanal
Universal Studios

References

Television channels in Poland
Television channels and stations established in 1995
 
Premium
1995 establishments in Poland
Lechia Gdańsk sponsors